Dohori (  or ), also known as Lok Dohori, is a type of Nepali folk song usually sung by two teams, one of the men and another of women. It is in the form of question and answer where a team sings a question and the opponent replies through an equally lyrical impromptu couplet and vice versa. The term dohori, means 'back and forth' and refers to the exchange of lyrical phrases between the contesting singers. The song production is collaborative and involves many individuals.

Like all Nepali folk songs, dohori originated in the rural areas of Nepal and now is sung in both rural and urban settlements and is popular amongst the Nepali speaking diaspora in the UK, US, and Bahrain. The men and women sit on opposite sides and the goal is to keep improvising until one team runs out of witty answers. The dohori is said to have stretched to seven days and nights during the past.
 	
Dohori is sung on a repeating main phrase of a well-known folk song but the song is adapted as the questions are posed and answered. Teams may also be male vs. male (bhale dohori), female vs. female (pothi dohori) or in mixed genders (rally dohori). Subjects range among love, tragedy, society, politics and development.

See also 
 Ratyoli
 Music of Nepal

References

Nepalese music
Nepalese styles of music
 *
Nepalese musical genres
Culture of Gandaki
Culture of Lumbini
Culture of Bagmati